Nihad Milak (born October 22, 1958) is a retired Bosnian-Herzegovinian footballer. During his senior career he played only for FK Sarajevo.

External links

forum.b92.net profile
parapsihopatologija.com Season 1986/87 data

1958 births
Living people
Footballers from Sarajevo
Association football defenders
Yugoslav footballers
FK Sarajevo players
Yugoslav First League players